Injectable filler (injectable cosmetic filler, injectable facial filler) is a soft tissue filler injected into the skin at different depths to help fill in facial wrinkles, provide facial volume, and augment facial features: restoring a smoother appearance. Most of these wrinkle fillers are temporary because they are eventually absorbed by the body. Most dermal fillers today consist of hyaluronic acid, a naturally occurring polysaccharide that is present in skin and cartilage. Some people may need more than one injection to achieve the wrinkle-smoothing effect. The effect lasts for about six months or longer. Successful results depend on health of the skin, skill of the health care provider, and type of filler used. Regardless of material (whether synthetic or organic) filler duration is highly dependent on amount of activity in the region where it is injected. Exercise and high intensity activities such as manual labor can stimulate blood flow and shorten the lifespan of fillers.

In the US, fillers are approved as medical devices by the Food and Drug Administration (FDA) and the injection is prescribed and performed by a provider. What defines a qualified dermal injection provider varies by country and is a point of debate between board-certified doctors and injectors who operate under cosmetic or aesthetician licenses. Fillers are not to be confused with Neurotoxins such as Botox. Fillers are not approved for certain parts of the body where they can be unsafe, including the penis. Injectable fillers may be used in these regions - forehead, temples, under eye zone, cheekbones, nose, midface (nasolabial folds), around the mouth, lips, chin, and jawline. Except for those areas, dermal fillers are also effective for treatments in the neck, décolleté, and hands zones. In Europe and the UK, fillers are non-prescription medical devices that can be injected by anyone licensed to do so by the respective medical authorities.  They require a CE mark, which regulates adherence to production standards, but does not require any demonstration of medical efficacy.  As a result, there are over 140 injectable fillers in the UK/European market and only six approved for use in the US. In China, the market of cosmetic surgery increase in recent 10 years, NMPA (formerly CFDA) also has issued several guidance to regulate injectable filler.

Medical uses 
Dermal fillers, also known as "injectables" or "soft-tissue fillers," fill in the area under the skin, and have some non-cosmetic uses, such as:
non-surgical cleft repair/modification 
 treating fat loss secondary to HIV. Fillers were found to give a temporary acceptable therapeutic effect in HIV‐infected patients with severe facial lipodystrophy which is caused by the highly active antiretroviral therapy. A systemic review concluded that the injectable fillers resulted in high satisfaction, however, further research is needed to determine the safety of its use.

Risks
Risks of an improperly performed dermal filler procedure commonly include bruising, redness, pain, or itching.  Less commonly, there may be infections or allergic reactions, which may cause scarring and lumps that may require surgical correction. More rarely, serious adverse effects such as blindness due to retrograde (opposite the direction of normal blood flow) embolization into the ophthalmic and retinal arteries can occur. Delayed skin necrosis can also occur as a complication of embolization. Embolic complications are more frequently seen when autologous fat is used as a filler, followed by hyaluronic acid. Though rare, when vision loss does occur, it is usually permanent.

Materials used 
Fillers are made of sugar molecules or composed of hyaluronic acids, collagens (which may come from pigs, cows, cadavers, or may be generated in a laboratory), the person's own transplanted fat, and biosynthetic polymers. Examples of the latter include calcium hydroxylapatite, polycaprolactone, polymethylmethacrylate, and polylactic acid. In 2012, "Artiste Assisted Injection System" was launched in the US market to assist in the delivery of dermal fillers. A study in 2013 concluded that the injecting device can achieve reductions in patient discomfort and adverse events by controlling the rate of flow of injection of the filler the practitioner is using to fill in the lips and frown lines.

See also 
 Botulinum toxin
 Wrinkle
 Cosmetic surgery

References 

Implants (medicine)
Plastic surgery
Plastic surgery filler
AbbVie brands